The TBD Science Fiction Story Award (TBD Bilimkurgu Öykü Yarışması) is an award for Turkish science fiction given to the winner of the TBD (Turkish Informatics Association) Science Fiction Story Contest. This is the only institutionalized contest in the area of science fiction story in Turkey since its foundation in 1998. The contest specification is posted every April on www.tbd.org.tr or www.bilisimdergisi.org. The award ceremony is held every autumn during the Information Convention in Ankara, Turkey.

The contest strives to arouse interest in science fiction in young writers with potential, seek answers for “what have we been, what have we become, what will we be?” and raise the number of Works in Turkish science fiction. So as to awaken more interest, TBD also organizes a “guess the winner story” contest. The number of contest participants between 1998-2011 have been over 1500.

Award Winners and Juries

External links
 Türkiye Bilişim Derneği
 Bilişim Dergisi

Science fiction awards